Richard Thomas Godsell (9 January 1880 – 11 April 1954) was an English cricketer. He played for Gloucestershire between 1903 and 1910. Thomas was educated at Clifton College and Trinity College, Cambridge. During World War I he was an officer in the Royal Army Service Corps.

References

1880 births
1954 deaths
Alumni of Trinity College, Cambridge
British Army personnel of World War I
Cambridge University cricketers
Cricketers from Stroud
English cricketers
Gloucestershire cricketers
Marylebone Cricket Club cricketers
People educated at Clifton College
Royal Army Service Corps officers